Dimitri Tyomkin (born March 25, 1977) is a Canadian chess grandmaster (2001).

In 1997 he won the Israeli Junior Championship and the European Junior Chess Championship in Tallinn. In 2004 he tied for 1st–2nd with Alexander Moiseenko in the Canadian Open Chess Championship in Kapuskasing and tied for 3rd–6th with Igor Zugic, Mark Bluvshtein and Tomas Krnan in the Canadian Chess Championship in Toronto. He played for Canada in the Chess Olympiad of 2004.

Notable games
Dimitri Tyomkin vs M Hidalgo, XV Carlos Torre 2002, Sicilian Defense: Old Sicilian. General (B30), 1-0
Dimitri Tyomkin vs Semen I Dvoirys, Beer Shiva Rapid 2004, Sicilian Defense: Najdorf Variation (B91), 1-0

References

External links
 
 
 
 
 

1977 births
Living people
Israeli chess players
Canadian chess players
Jewish chess players
Chess grandmasters
Israeli Jews
Jewish Canadian sportspeople
Chess Olympiad competitors